Qu Bo is the name of:

Qu Bo (writer) (1923–2002), Chinese author
Qu Bo (footballer) (born 1981), Chinese association footballer

See also
Qubo (disambiguation)